Abdullah Wabran Saihan (born 2 July 1971) is a former Kuwaiti footballers, he played for Kuwait national football team. He participated in two editions of the Olympic Games (1992, 2000) and in two editions of the AFC Asian Cup (1996, 2000).

Honours

Personal
 Best player of the 1996 Gulf Cup of Nations in Oman

Club
Al-Arabi
Kuwait Emir Cup in 1996, 2006
 Kuwait Crown Prince Cup in 1996, 2007

Al-Rayyan
Emir of Qatar Cup in 1999
Qatar Cup in 1996

National
Gulf Cup of Nations 1996,1998
 Third place in the 1998 Arab Nations Cup

References

External links
 

1971 births
Living people
Kuwaiti footballers
Kuwait international footballers
Olympic footballers of Kuwait
Footballers at the 1992 Summer Olympics
Footballers at the 2000 Summer Olympics
1996 AFC Asian Cup players
2000 AFC Asian Cup players
Association football midfielders
Kuwaiti expatriate footballers
Expatriate footballers in Qatar
Kuwaiti expatriate sportspeople in Qatar
Al-Arabi SC (Kuwait) players
Al-Rayyan SC players
Qatar Stars League players
Al Tadhamon SC players
Kuwait Premier League players